The USS Mitscher (DDG-57) is an  in service with the United States Navy. It was constructed by Ingalls Shipbuilding, in Pascagoula, Mississippi on an order in December 1988. Laid down in 1992 it was formally commissioned on 10 December 1994.

Namesake
USS Mitscher (DDG-57) became the second United States Navy warship named to honor Admiral Marc A. Mitscher (1887–1947), famed naval aviator and World War II aircraft carrier task force commander.

Service history
USS Mitscher was commissioned on 10 December 1994, and was sponsored by Mrs. Elizabeth Ferguson. Mitscher transferred to her homeport in Norfolk, Virginia later in December 1994, and has since made three Mediterranean deployments and participated in many Caribbean exercises.
On 20 September 1998 a plaque was dedicated to USS Mitscher at Mahon (Naval) Cemetery where US and UK sailors lie at rest, some from various ships in the 1800s.

In 2001, Mitscher deployed with Carrier Group 2 centered on the aircraft carrier . During this deployment, Mitscher visited Algiers, Algeria and conducted joint training exercises with the Algerian Navy. In October 2006, Mitscher participated in Neptune Warrior, a joint war exercise with navies from all over the world.

On 16 February 2007, Mitscher was awarded the 2006 Battle "E" award.

Beginning 23 July 2011, during its 2011 deployment, the strike group's anti-piracy capabilities was augmented by the addition of a U.S. Coast Guard 12-person Advanced Interdiction Team (AIT) embarked aboard Mitscher. These deployable Coast Guard boarding teams consisted of highly trained maritime law enforcement specialists capable of Level III non-compliant boardings. As the only organization in the U.S. government with the combined authority of a law enforcement agency, an intelligence agency, and a military service, they brought additional capabilities and expertise to Mitschers embarked visit, board, search and seizure (VBSS) team. Mitschers VBSS team and the AIT trained together between operations to enhance their joint boarding tactics, boat operation skills, and internal movements.

On 13 August 2011, as part of Combined Task Force 150 operating in the Gulf of Aden, Mitscher provided assistance to the Sri Lankan-flagged cargo vessel Al Habib which was experiencing engineering problems and running low on water.  Mitschers VBSS-AIT boarding party transported supplies to Al Habib via rigid-hulled inflatable boat, including two 3-gallon (11.36 liters) containers of water and four cases of bottled water.

On 24 February 2012 Commander Monika W. Stoker became the first African-American female to become the Commanding Officer of a United States warship. Commander Stoker relieved Commander Brian K. Sorrenson after serving as his Executive Officer for 20 months prior.

On 16 April 2022, Mitscher arrived at Norfolk following a surge deployment.

Coat of arms 
The combined anchor and trident symbolize sea prowess and combat readiness. The life preserver ringing the anchor commemorates Admiral Mitscher's compassion for his crew as manifested through his relentless determination in tracking down and recovering downed air crews. The three tines of the trident represent the ship's significant capabilities in strike, air, and subsurface warfare. The trident's position, rising above the crest, symbolizes the ability to project power over great distances. The gold wings represent Admiral Mitscher's service and dedication, throughout his career, in advancing naval aviation and developing strike warfare.
Dark blue and gold are the colors traditionally associated with the Navy and represent the sea and excellence. Red is emblematic of sacrifice and valor. The cross throughout the shield recalls the Navy Cross Admiral Mitscher was awarded for his participation in the first successful transatlantic air passage. The two stars above the cross commemorate his awards of 2nd and 3rd Distinguished Service Medals and his 2nd and 3rd awards of the Navy Cross for meritorious service during operations in the Pacific during World War II. The armored gauntlet represents the strength and survivability of the ship. The lightning bolts symbolize energy and speed and the ability of the ship to conduct multi-mission operations in any dimension. The gauntlet grasping the lightning bolts highlights USS MITSCHER's motto "SEIZE THE DAY", recalling Admiral Mitscher's tenacious fighting spirit and dignifying DDG 57's legacy.

Gallery

References

External links

Official USS Mitscher Web site

 

Arleigh Burke-class destroyers
Destroyers of the United States
Ships built in Pascagoula, Mississippi
1993 ships